Alucheh Malek (also Romanized as Ālūcheh Malek, Ālūcheh Molk, and Aloocheh Malek; also known as Alchamulk, Al’chamyul’k, Ālcheh Molk, Alcheh Molk, Ālūeheh Molk, and Alūjeh Molk) is a village in Rudqat Rural District, Sufian District, Shabestar County, East Azerbaijan Province, Iran. At the 2006 census, its population was 140, in 36 families.

References 

Populated places in Shabestar County